Rodger Parsons previously credited as Ken Gates, is an American voice actor, narrator and writer. He is best known as the English narrator for the Pokémon television series.

Filmography

Feature film and TV credits
 New York, feature – Yash Raj Films, Gibson
 Betrayed, feature – telephone caller
 New Year's Day, feature – the Boss
 You've Got to Walk It, feature – character narrator
 Pokémon, TV show – Narrator (4Kids dub Season 1–6; Pokémon USA/The Pokémon Company International dub Season 9–onward)
 Pokémon, Movies - Narrator (4Kids dub Movies 1–5, Pokémon USA/The Pokémon Company International dub Movie 9–onward, and Pokémon: Mewtwo Returns)

Documentary film credits
 Native Americans in the Civil War, History Channel – narrator
 The Hermitage, 18-part series – NET – narrator
 Water, NET – narrator
 Flight Deck, Military Channel – narrator
 Vertical Flight, Military Channel – narrator
 Pulitzer, NET – character voice
 The United States Pharmacopeia – narrator
 Air Force Office of Scientific Research – Narrator
 History of Nazism, 2-part series – writer/narrator
 Story of Fascism, 5-part series – writer/narrator
 In the Deep – writer/narrator
 All in a Day's Work – narrator
 John Paul — The People's Pope – narrator
 Mandela – narrator

Feature film looping credits
 Across the Universe – newscaster voice
 Michael – featured voice
 Someone to Watch Over Me
 Sleepless in Seattle
 The Bonfire of the Vanities
 Billy Bathgate

Video game credits 
 Dissidia Final Fantasy – Cid of the Lufaine
 Dissidia 012 Final Fantasy – Cid of the Lufaine
 Mood Shifters – Narrator
 Like It or Not – Narrator
 Once on a Wink – Narrator
 Pokémon Battle Revolution – Narrator
 PokéROM – narrator
 I Spy Treasure Hunt – Voice of Pirate
 Bullet Witch – Voice of Darkness

Notable voice roles
 Narrator/Announcer in the English version of Pokémon Battle Revolution''

Software
 IVONA Eric Voice Model

References

External links
 More information on Rodger Parsons
 

Living people
American male voice actors
American male video game actors
Male actors from New York (state)
Place of birth missing (living people)
Year of birth missing (living people)